Matthew Wilfred Appleby (born 16 April 1972 in Middlesbrough) is an English former football midfielder who retired in 2008. He played in the Premier League with Barnsley and had a distinguished spell at Darlington, before dropping into non-League and eventually leaving football to become a deep-sea diver.

References

External links

1972 births
Living people
English footballers
Newcastle United F.C. players
Darlington F.C. players
Barnsley F.C. players
Oldham Athletic A.F.C. players
Whitby Town F.C. players
Footballers from Middlesbrough
Premier League players
English Football League players
Association football midfielders